The municipalities of Brazil are administrative divisions of the Brazilian states. Brazil currently has 5,570 municipalities, which, given the 2019 population estimate of 210,147,125, makes an average municipality population of 37,728 inhabitants. The average state in Brazil has 214 municipalities. Roraima is the least subdivided state, with 15 municipalities, while Minas Gerais is the most, with 853. Northern states are divided into small numbers of large municipalities (e.g. Amazonas is divided into only 62 municipalities), and therefore they cover large areas incorporating several separated cities or towns that do not necessarily conform to one single conurbation. Southern and western states on the other hand, are divided into many small municipalities (e.g. Minas Gerais is divided into 853 municipalities), and therefore large urban areas usually extend over several municipalities which form one single conurbation.

The Federal District cannot be divided into municipalities, which is why its territory is composed of several administrative regions. These regions are directly managed by the government of the Federal District, which exercises constitutional and legal powers that are equivalent to those of the states, as well as those of the municipalities, thus simultaneously assuming all the obligations arising from them.

The 1988 Brazilian Constitution treats the municipalities as parts of the Federation and not simply dependent subdivisions of the states. Each municipality has an autonomous local government, comprising a mayor (prefeito) and a legislative body called municipal chamber (câmara municipal). Both the local government and the legislative body are directly elected by the population every four years. These elections take place at the same time all over the country; the last municipal elections were held on 15 November 2020. Each municipality has the constitutional power to approve its own laws, as well as collecting taxes and receiving funds from the state and federal governments. However, municipal governments have no judicial power per se, and courts are only organised at the state or federal level. A subdivision of the state judiciary, or comarca, can either correspond to an individual municipality or encompass several municipalities.

The seat of the municipal administration is a nominated city (cidade), with no specification in the law about the minimum population, area or facilities. The city always has the same name as the municipality, as they are not treated as distinct entities. Municipalities can be subdivided, only for administrative purposes, into districts (normally, new municipalities are formed from these districts). Other populated sites are villages, but with no legal effect or regulation. Almost all municipalities are subdivided into neighbourhoods (bairros), although most municipalities do not officially define their neighbourhood limits (usually small cities in the countryside).

Municipalities can be split or merged to form new municipalities within the borders of the state, if the population of the involved municipalities expresses a desire to do so in a plebiscite. However, these must abide by the Brazilian Constitution, and forming exclaves or seceding from the state or union is expressly forbidden.

A
 Municipalities of Acre (AC)
 Municipalities of Alagoas (AL)
 Municipalities of Amapá (AP)
 Municipalities of Amazonas (AM)

B
 Municipalities of Bahia (BA)

C
 Municipalities of Ceará (CE)

E
 Municipalities of Espírito Santo (ES)

G
 Municipalities of Goiás (GO)

M
 Municipalities of Maranhão (MA)
 Municipalities of Mato Grosso (MT)
 Municipalities of Mato Grosso do Sul (MS)
 Municipalities of Minas Gerais (MG)

P
 Municipalities of Pará (PA)
 Municipalities of Paraíba (PB)
 Municipalities of Paraná (PR)
 Municipalities of Pernambuco (PE)
 Municipalities of Piauí (PI)

R
 Municipalities of Rio de Janeiro (RJ)
 Municipalities of Rio Grande do Norte (RN)
 Municipalities of Rio Grande do Sul (RS)
 Municipalities of Rondônia (RO)
 Municipalities of Roraima (RR)

S
 Municipalities of Santa Catarina (SC)
 Municipalities of São Paulo (SP)
 Municipalities of Sergipe (SE)

T
 Municipalities of Tocantins (TO)

See also
 Lists of cities
 List of cities in Brazil by population

References

External links

 
 Brazilian Institute of Geography and Statistics 

 

Subdivisions of Brazil
Municipalities, Brazil